The 1973 Men's Hockey World Cup was the second installment of the Hockey World Cup.  It was held from 24 August to 2 September at the Wagener Stadium in Amstelveen, Netherlands. The tournament was won by host nation the Netherlands, who defeated India 4–2 on penalty strokes after the final had finished 2–2. It was the first World Cup to introduce the 12 teams format which became the standard format of the FIH Hockey World Cup until the 1998 edition.

Teams

The top eight teams from last year's Summer Olympics in Munich qualified automatically: England qualified in place of Great Britain from the Olympics spot as most of the players from that squad were from England, and England had a better record among the Home Nations. 

Australia, despite qualifying through the Olympics, withdrew because of lack of funds. Originally, four teams were to be invited for the World Cup, but after the withdrawal of Australia this was were increased to five. 
Spain, Malaysia, Belgium and Japan were all invited by the FIH for the event, while New Zealand was invited to replace Australia.

Other nations who showed interest in competing were  Canada, France, Gibraltar, Ireland, Italy, Mexico, Nigeria, Poland, Ireland, Scotland, Wales, Rhodesia, South Africa, and the Soviet Union.

Group stage

Pool A

Matchday 1

Matchday 2

Matchday 3

Matchday 4

Matchday 5

Pool B

Matchday 1

Matchday 2

Matchday 3

Matchday 4

Matchday 5

Classification round

Ninth to twelfth place classification

Ninth to twelfth bracket

Eleventh and twelfth place - 11th/12th

Ninth and tenth place - 9th/10th

Fifth to eighth place classification

Fifth to eighth bracket

Seventh and eighth place - 7th/8th

Fifth and sixth place - 5th/6th

Semi-finals

Third and fourth place - 3rd/4th

Final 

The final was held on 2 September 1973 at the Wagener Stadium, Amstelveen. The hosts Netherlands defeated India on penalty strokes after the match ended 2–2 after extra time. The win gave Netherlands their first FIH Hockey World Cup title, becoming the second team to win it and the first from Europe and the first host nation to win it.

Surjit Singh of India scored two early goals in the first eight minutes giving India a 2–0 lead. He scored another goal in the first half for his hat-trick but it was disallowed by the umpire. India went into half time with two goals lead. In the second half Netherlands played more players forward and in result Ties Kruize scored two goals to equalize the match at 2–2. In extra time, India got a penalty stroke but B. P. Govinda missed the chance in sudden death. The match was decided by penalty strokes where the Indian goalkeeper Charles Cornelius failed to stop a single penalty stroke as Netherlands won the shoot out 4–2.

Final ranking

Notes

References

External links

 Official website
 Rediff summary
todor66/1973

Men's Hockey World Cup
World Cup
International field hockey competitions hosted by the Netherlands
Hockey World Cup
Sports competitions in Amstelveen
Hockey World Cup Men
Hockey World Cup Men